Ittihad Kalba Football Club is a football club in Kalba, United Arab Emirates.

History
Ittihad Kalba was established in 1972 when two clubs (Al Shabab) and (Al Rooba) merged with (Al Riyadiya) to create Al Ittihad Kalba.

Current squad

As of UAE Pro-League:

{|
|-
| valign="top" |

Unregistered players

{|
|-
| valign="top" |

Out on loan
{|
|-
| valign="top" |

Achievements
UAE Division One (7):
Champion: 1979–80, 1988–89, 1995–96, 1998–99, 2009–10, 2011–12, 2013–14

Pro-League Record

Notes 2019–20 UAE football season was cancelled due to the COVID-19 pandemic in the United Arab Emirates.

Key
 Pos. = Position
 Tms. = Number of teams
 Lvl. = League

Club staff

References

Ittihad
Ittihad
Association football clubs established in 1972
Organisations based in the Emirate of Sharjah
Sport in the Emirate of Sharjah